Kristen DeAnn Alderson (born May 29, 1991) is an American actress and singer, best known for her 15-year portrayal of Starr Manning on the ABC daytime drama One Life to Live, and for originating the role of Kiki Jerome on General Hospital.

Early life 
Alderson was born on May 29, 1991 in Huntingdon Valley, Pennsylvania, to Richard and Kathy Alderson. She has a younger brother, actor Eddie Alderson.

Career 
At six years old, Alderson auditioned for the One Life to Live role of Starr Manning in February 1998 and portrayed the character starting on March 20, 1998. and was put on contract with the series in April 2001. She has appeared in television commercials for JC Penney, Citgo and Soap Network.

Alderson received the 2005 Soap Opera Digest Award Favorite Teen for her work in One Life to Live. Alderson's younger brother, Eddie, portrayed Matthew Buchanan on One Life to Live until its cancellation. After One Life to Live finished filming on November 18, 2011, Alderson relocated with her brother to Los Angeles. On April 14, 2011, ABC announced the cancellation of both All My Children and One Life to Live, leaving General Hospital as the last remaining soap opera airing on the network after January 13, 2012.

On January 11, 2012, it was announced that Alderson, along with former co-stars Kassie DePaiva, Michael Easton, and Roger Howarth, would reprise her One Life to Live role on ABC's sole remaining soap opera General Hospital. She debuted on the series on February 24, 2012 and left on March 20, 2013. Prospect Park currently owns the rights to all One Life to Live characters; TV Guide reported that because ABC does not want to risk any further legal disputes with Prospect Park concerning the characters, the only way to avoid such disputes may be to have the former One Life to Live actors portray "characters that in no way resemble the current ones" in order to stay on General Hospital. Alderson returned to General Hospital as  Kiki Jerome. In 2013, she received a Daytime Emmy Award for Outstanding Younger Actress in a Drama Series for her work as Starr on General Hospital in 2012.

On September 24, 2013, Kristen Alderson was honored as "The Star of Tomorrow" by the ZEPHRA Magazine Recognition Awards and the City of West Hollywood issued a proclamation for the actress. On January 10, 2015, Soap Opera Digest reported that Alderson decided to depart General Hospital, opting to not renew her contract with the series. Her role of Kiki Jerome was recast. On October 26, 2014, Alderson performed The Star-Spangled Banner at the University of Phoenix Stadium where the visiting Philadelphia Eagles faced the Arizona Cardinals. She began starring in the Off-Broadway play, The Marvelous Wonderettes, in the role of Cindy Lou in April 2018. In June 2018, Alderson expressed her wishes to return to General Hospital as Starr Manning.

Filmography

Television

Stage

Awards and nominations

References

External links
 
 

1991 births
Actresses from Pennsylvania
American child actresses
American soap opera actresses
Living people
Daytime Emmy Award winners
Daytime Emmy Award for Outstanding Younger Actress in a Drama Series winners
People from Bucks County, Pennsylvania
21st-century American women singers
21st-century American singers